The Danish Film Institute is the national Danish agency responsible for supporting and encouraging film and cinema culture, and for conserving these in the national interest.

Also known as Filmhuset ("the film house"), it is located in Gothersgade in central Copenhagen. Facilities directed at the general public include a library and Cinemateket which is Denmark's national film museum.

It is an institution under the Danish Ministry of Cultural Affairs. The current director of the film institute is Claus Ladegaard. The institute is a member of European Film Promotion, the network of European film organisations for the worldwide promotion of European film.

History
The Danish Film Institute was founded in 1972, replacing the Danish Film Foundation (Danish: Den Danske Filmfond). In 1996 a new Danish Film Act merged the Film Institute with Statens Filmcentral and the National Danish Film Museum with effect from the following year and at the same event the institution relocated to its current premises at Filmhuset in Gothersgade.

Activities
The Danish Film Institute is active within three main areas which are subsidized:
 Production and development of all types of films
 Distribution and communication of films and film culture
 Archives and museum activities
The Film Institute presents Danish films at festivals abroad and in Denmark and subsidizes the import of foreign quality films. It maintains the Danish National Filmography (Danmarks Nationalfilmografi), a database about Danish films since 1896.

Facilities

Cinemateket
Cinemateket is the national Danish film museum, dedicated to broaden the knowledge and interest in Danish as well as foreign film. It has three cinemas which show a combination of film classics and quality films of various themes. Occasionally contemporary films which would otherwise not reach the Danish market are shown. In the videoteque in the library is it possible to watch short and documentary films. Other facilities include a book shop, a café and a restaurant.

Library

The Danish Film Institute's library on the first floor holds 55,000 books and subscribes to 240 mainly European and American magazines. The library lends regular books—usually for a period of one month—while magazines, manuscripts and rarer publications may only be referenced on the premises.

DFI Directors

References

External links
Danish Film Institute
ACE - Association of European Film Archives and Cinematheques

Film organizations in Denmark
Cinemas in Copenhagen
1972 establishments in Denmark
Arts organizations established in 1972
Film archives in Europe
Archives in Denmark
FIAF-affiliated institutions